Chemical Geology is an international peer-reviewed academic journal. The journal is affiliated with the European Association of Geochemistry and it is published by Elsevier., publishing both subscription and open access articles. The journal is a hybrid open-access journal.

Chemical Geology publishes original research papers on isotopic and elemental geochemistry, geochronology and cosmochemistry.

The journal focuses on chemical processes in igneous, metamorphic, and sedimentary petrology, low- and high-temperature aqueous solutions, biogeochemistry, the environment and cosmochemistry.

References

External links 
 
 

Elsevier academic journals
Geochemistry journals
Publications established in 1966
English-language journals